Mike Tramp & The Rock 'N' Roll Circuz is a studio album by former Freak of Nature and current White Lion lead vocalist Mike Tramp, released on 5 October 2009. The album is Tramp's fifth solo album and the first since 2004's Songs I Left Behind.

Background and recording
Following the release of Return of the Pride in 2008 which was White Lion’s first original studio album in 16 years, Tramp faced a tumultuous time of professional indecision as he tried to decide between continuing his solo career or pouring his energy into White Lion.
The album was initially intended to be the next new White Lion album but a new solo band was formed instead. 

The new album was co-produced in Copenhagen, Denmark, with guitar player Søren Andersen, and both band and album were named after the atmosphere in the studio. "(The recording experience) made us visualize this old fallen apart circus," said Tramp. "From there we built certain things into the songs and into the album". During the making of the album, Tramp appeared on the Danish reality music TV show "All Stars".

Release and promotion

Released only in Denmark via Kick Music/Sony Music, the album hit the IFPI, Denmark's official top 40 hitlist albums chart at number 16 on October 16, 2009.

The songs, "All Of My Life" and "Come On", were released as singles from the album. "Come On" also featured a teaser music video.

Track listing

Personnel
 Mike Tramp – vocals, guitar
 Claus Langeskov – bass guitar
 Søren Andersen – guitar
 Morten Hellborn – drums
 Emily Garriock – keyboards, Vocals

Second Time Around

Second Time Around is the twelfth solo album by Mike Tramp, released on May 1, 2020 through Target Records. It consists of ten re-recordings from his 2009 album, The Rock 'N' Roll Circuz. The new versions were produced by Mike Tramp and Soren Anderson at Medley Studios in Copenhagen.

Further singles were released to promote this new release with "The Road" which also features a new music video  and the radio single "Between Good and Bad", both being released in advance. The new version of "When She Cries" was also released as a single following the album's official release, the song was dedicated to his daughter.

Track listing

Personnel
 Mike Tramp: Vocals, electric and acoustic guitar, piano 
 Oliver Steffensen: guitar
 Soren Andersen: additional guitar
 Claus Langeskov: bass 
 Morten Hellborn: drums

Additional  
 Marcus Nand: 12 string acoustic guitar
 Jay Boe: Hammond B-3
 Emily Garriock Langeskov: backing vocals
 Lars Rahbek Andresen: piano on "Highway"

Artwork
Photographer/album art - Jakob Muxoll

Charts

References

2009 albums
Mike Tramp albums